Lifehouse International Church Hong Kong is an English, Cantonese and Mandarin speaking church located in Jordan, Hong Kong.

It belongs to the Lifehouse International Church Global movement, under the leadership of Rod and Viv Plummer in Japan. Lifehouse International Church is Pentecostal church and a partner with the ARC Church Planting Network.

History 
In 2009, Lifehouse International Church Tokyo adopted a small church in Hong Kong, which then became Lifehouse International Church Hong Kong. In June 2011, Richard Welsh moved from Tokyo to Hong Kong to pastor the church under the leadership of Rod and Viv Plummer. Richard Welsh is a credentialed minister with the ACC.

In June 2013, Lifehouse International Church Hong Kong moved to Mong Kok and occupied the 11th floor of the Win Century Building on Mong Kok Road. 

In January 2020, Lifehouse Hong Kong permanently relocated from Mong Kok to the 2/F and 11/F of Hub 8, on 239 Temple Street in Jordan, Kowloon.

Church Services 
Lifehouse International Church Hong Kong has bilingual services in English and Cantonese. There are in-person and online services every week. The church is located very close to Exit A of Jordan MTR station, on the Kowloon-side of Hong Kong.

Lifehouse Kids 
Lifehouse Kids is a children's program that is run both online and during some in-person services.

References

External links

 

Protestant churches in Hong Kong
Pentecostal denominations in Asia